State Route 240 (SR-240) is a short state highway in the U.S. state of Utah. It serves as a connector route between Interstate 15/Interstate 84 (I-15/I-84) and SR-38 in Honeyville.

Route description 

The route begins at exit 372 on I-15/I-84 and proceeds east on 6900 North. It proceeds east for about one mile before crossing Salt Creek and the Union Pacific Railroad tracks.  Shortly thereafter, it enters the central area of Honeyville and comes to its eastern terminus at 2600 West (SR-38).

History 
Upon the recommendation of Honeyville officials, the route was added to the state highway system in 1982.

Major intersections

References 

240
 240